The Public International Law & Policy Group (PILPG) is a non-profit organization, operating as a global pro bono law firm providing free legal assistance to developing states and sub-state entities involved in conflicts.  PILPG also provides policy formulation advice and training on matters related to conflict resolution, including transitional justice, documentation of human rights violations, and community-level peacebuilding. To date, PILPG has advised over two dozen states and numerous civil society organizations on the legal aspects of peace negotiations and post-conflict constitution drafting. It has also advised numerous government and non-governmental actors in Europe, Asia and Africa about protecting human rights, prosecuting atrocity crimes, and rebuilding communities from the grassroots up.

PILPG promotes the utilization of international law as an alternative to violent conflict for resolving international disputes. To accomplish this objective, PILPG provides legal counsel to states during peace negotiations, advises on the creation and operation of tribunals for the prosecution of war crimes, assists states with drafting constitutions, runs negotiation simulations, publishes field reports concerning ongoing or potential conflicts, and convenes expert roundtables to identify points of conflict and potential solutions.

To provide pro bono legal advice and policy formulation expertise, PILPG primarily relies on its highly trained international law and development professionals who serve as assistant counsel, counsel, and chiefs of party, run all PILPG programs, interface with clients, and manage grantor relationships. Upon occasion, PILPG also uses volunteer legal assistance from other practicing international lawyers as well as pro bono assistance from major international law firms.

From 1996 to 1998, PILPG operated under the auspices of the Carnegie Endowment for International Peace. In July 1999, the United Nations granted official Non-Governmental Organization status to PILPG.

Primary practice areas

Peace negotiations
PILPG is frequently called upon to provide legal and political counsel to parties and mediators engaged in peace negotiations. PILPG works closely with clients to clarify and prioritize goals, develop negotiation strategies, and create effective mechanisms for implementing peace agreements. PILPG members customarily participate as advisors during negotiations, and PILPG frequently opens in-country program offices to support its peace negotiations work. To date, PILPG has advised participants in over two dozen international peace negotiations.

Post-conflict constitutions
PILPG contributes legal assistance and political counsel to parties involved in drafting and implementing post-conflict constitutions. PILPG works closely with clients to translate political agreements into effective constitutional provisions. PILPG frequently opens offices in-country to support its post-conflict constitution work and has assisted over a dozen states and governments in drafting and implementing post-conflict constitutions.

Policy planning
PILPG provides policy planning assistance to states and governments to help them develop and implement foreign and domestic policy initiatives, design state institutions, engage in strategic planning, and coordinate multistate partnerships.  PILPG provides policy planning assistance to support clients engaged in negotiating ceasefire agreements. To date, PILPG has provided policy planning assistance to over two dozen transitioning states and governments.

War crimes prosecution
War crimes trials have become a critically important component of nation building. PILPG’s War Crimes Practice Area was established in 1996, with an agreement between Richard Goldstone and PILPG to provide research assistance to the International Prosecutor on issues pending before the ICTY. In the past, the War Crimes Practice Group has also provided research assistance to the ICTR, the Special Court for Sierra Leone, the Iraqi Special Tribunal, and the International Criminal Court. PILPG advises these tribunals on the entire spectrum of issues pertaining to war crimes prosecution.

Water Diplomacy
In the past, PILPG has provided legal assistance to states, government officials, and key stakeholders involved in water conflicts.  PILPG’s approach promoted peaceful resolution of water disputes in accordance with international law. To promote the peaceful resolution of water disputes, PILPG also developed a series of negotiation simulations and convened a number of policy planning roundtables with law firm partners.

Democracy and governance
PILPG has given policy analysis and legal assistance to states and sub-state entities on matters aimed at strengthening the rule of law and promoting effective governance.  PILPG has advised numerous states and governments on a wide range of issues, including enacting fair and legitimate laws, enhancing civil society involvement in public policy making, and protecting human and minority rights. PILPG has dealt with nationality and citizenship, children's rights, due process protections, implementation of international standards, and rule of law issues.

Managing Board 
Paul Williams (professor), President
Michael Scharf, Managing Director
Milena Sterio, Board Member

References

External links
The Public International Law and Policy Group
Ploughshares Fund's Interview with Paul R. Williams
USAID Highlights PILPG's Work in Georgia
Voice of America Features PILPG's Work with Special Court for Sierra Leone

Legal organizations based in the United States
Non-profit organizations based in Washington, D.C.